RwS bank is a Ukrainian bank founded in 1991 in Kyiv. It provides different services such as loans, deposits, purchase and sale of bank metals, etc. The central office is located in Kyiv. It was previously owned by Swedbank Group and operated in 2007–2013 as Swedbank (Ukraine).

History 
In October 1991 the bank JSCB Intellect was created. Then, the bank changed its name to JSCB Kyiv-Privat.

In 2001, the bank received the first foreign investments from the French financial conglomerate Société Générale and turned the name for JSCB Société Générale Ukraine.

In 2007, the bank owners changed, and it had the name CJSC TAS-Investbank.

In October 2007, the bank was renamed as JSCB TAS-Commerzbank.

In December 2007, the company was headed by a new foreign investor from the Swedbank Group and the bank was renamed as Swedbank Invest.

In 2009, the form of ownership and the name of the bank was changed to PJSC Swedbank.

In 2013, the Swedbank Group decided to exit the financial market of Ukraine. The bank was sold to new Ukrainian investors, who later rebranded Swedbank to Omega Bank.

In June 2015, Ukrainian business group LLC owned by Ruslan Demchak invested into the bank and renamed it as RwS bank.

Since January 2021, Oksana Kotlyarevska has been the chairman of the board, having replaced Oleksand Stetsiuk at this position.

As at 2022, “RwS bank” has 14 branches. There are 7 branches in Kyiv, and in other cities the bank is represented by two branches in Lviv, and one in Vinnytsia, Korosten, Odessa, Ternopil, Chortkiv.

The bank's сentral office is located at Kyiv, 6 Prorizna Str.

Activity 
RwS bank has a banking license No. 277 and can provide a full range of banking services to customers such as settlement and cash services, foreign exchange transactions, bank guarantees, factoring services, etc.

According to the rating agency Rurik, RwS bank has been assigned a long-term credit rating at the level of uaAА+.

As at January 1, 2017, RwS bank is one of the largest taxpayers in the banking sector.

Membership 
RwS bank is a member of the Individual Deposits Guarantee Fund, Independent Bank Association of Ukraine, Ukrainian Entrepreneurs Union, and Ukrainian Banks Association.

Board 
As of 2022:

 Kotlyarevska Oksana Volodymyrivna – Chairman of the Board 
 Vaskovska Valentyna Petrivna – member of the board, Vice Chairman of the Board
 Mosieichuk Taisiia Fedorivna – member of the board, Vice Chairman of the Board
 Burdina Olena Mykhailivna – member of the board, chief accountant
 Gavrilchuk Iryna Borysivna – chairman of the supervisory board
 Mihashko Vitalyi Oleksiiovych – member of the supervisory board
 Yaremenko Serhii Oleksandrovych – member of the supervisory board
 Seredenko Dmitro Mykolaiovych – member of the supervisory board

Notes

External links 
 Official website 
 Facebook Page 
 Ownership structures of Ukrainian banks. NBU

Banks of Ukraine
Banks established in 2001